Trachycosmidae, is a family of spiders in the infraorder Araneomorphae.

Identification 
They can be identified by the lateral spinnerets, which are separated by the length of their diameter and have their complete distal article without inflatable area. The presence of two major ampullate gland spigots and the epigynal field formed by an undivided plate. The lens of the anterior lateral eyes are convex, raised from the surrounding cuticle, which in Trochanteriidae is flat.

Genera 
This family include 20 genera, most of which where part of the family Trochanteriidae and Gallieniellidae:

References 

Taxa described in 2002
Araneomorphae families
Araneomorphae